USS Las Vegas Victory (AK-229) was a  acquired by the U.S. Navy during World War II.  She served in the Pacific Ocean theatre of operations through the end of the war earning one battle star, and then returned to the United States for disposal.

Victory built in California
Las Vegas Victory, a cargo ship, was launched 1944, by Permanente Metals Corporation, Richmond, California; sponsored by Mrs. E. W. Cragin; acquired by the Navy 25 October 1944, and commissioned the same day.

World War II operations
After shakedown along the U.S. West Coast. Las Vegas Victory departed Astoria, Oregon, 26 November for the Pacific islands. Sailing via Eniwetok and Ulithi, the cargo ship arrived Kossol Passage, Palau Islands, 31 December, laden with 7,600 tons of vital ammunition.
 
From January to March 1945, Las Vegas Victory shuttled ammunition among the Caroline Islands and the Marshall Islands, and replenished the fighting ships as they moved closer to the Japanese homeland. Departing Ulithi 25 March, she sailed for the rendezvous with units heading for Okinawa. Making her way through submarine infested waters, the cargo ship arrived off Okinawa on the 31st, and replenished two escort carriers with ammunition.
 
On 1 April the invasion of Okinawa started the removal of the last barrier "on the road to Japan". Under constant attack by Japanese suicide pilots, Las Vegas Victory passed ammunition to battleships, aircraft carriers, destroyers, and LCT's until late May. Arriving San Pedro, Leyte, 10 June, she loaded more ammunition and sailed for Eniwetok 19 July.
 
Upon her arrival 1 week later, she was assigned to the Pacific Service Force. Las Vegas Victory supported American forces in the Pacific Ocean until 7 November when she departed Eniwetok for the United States.

Post-war decommissioning
The cargo ship arrived Port Discovery, Washington, 19 November; sailed for San Francisco, California, 15 February 1946; and decommissioned there 8 April for redelivery to the War Shipping Administration (WSA). She entered the National Defense Reserve Fleet and berthed at Puget Sound, Washington. On 25 February 2010, PMARS (Property Management and & Archive Record System) contact administrator advised that the USS Las Vegas Victory was sold for scrap in 1993.

Honors and awards
Las Vegas Victory received one battle star for World War II service.

References

  
 NavSource Online: Service Ship Photo Archive – AK-229 Las Vegas Victory

 

Boulder Victory-class cargo ships
Ships built in Richmond, California
1944 ships
Ammunition ships of the United States Navy
World War II auxiliary ships of the United States
Suisun Bay Reserve Fleet
James River Reserve Fleet
Hudson River Reserve Fleet
Olympia Reserve Fleet